Governor Cameron may refer to:

Angus Cameron (colonial administrator) (1871–1961), Governor of Mongalla Province from 1906 to 1908
Charles Cameron (colonial administrator) (1766–1820), Governor of the Bahamas from 1804 to 1820
Donald Charles Cameron (colonial administrator) (1872–1948), Governor of Tanganyika from 1925 to 1931 and 4th Governor of Nigeria from 1931 to 1935
Edward John Cameron (1858–1947), Governor of the Gambia from 1914 to 1920
William E. Cameron (1842–1927), 39th Governor of Virginia